Gundy is an English surname.  Notable people with the surname include:

 Cale Gundy (born 1972), American former college football quarterback at the University of Oklahoma, brother of Mike
 James Henry Gundy (1880–1951), Canadian businessman
 Mike Gundy (born 1967), American football coach and former player at Oklahoma State University, brother of Cale

See also
 Uncle Gundy, a Star Wars: Droids character
 Van Gundy, a surname

English-language surnames